is a domestic airport located  southeast of Ube-Shinkawa Station, Ube, Yamaguchi Prefecture, Japan. It is the westernmost airport on the island of Honshu, and is marketed as an alternative to the New Kitakyushu Airport for Yamaguchi prefecture residents flying to and from Tokyo.

History
The airport opened in 1966 as Ube Airport with daily propeller service to Haneda (ANA) and Itami (JDA). The airport was renamed to Yamaguchi Ube in 1980 following the introduction of jet service on the Haneda route.

Facilities 
The airport has separate domestic and international terminals. There are three gates, two of which are connected to the domestic terminal, and the third of which is connected to both terminals.

Airlines and destinations

Statistics

Ground transportation links
The airport is within walking distance of Kusae Station, a small, unmanned station on the Ube Line with direct scheduled train service to Shin-Yamaguchi Station.

The airport is also linked by bus to Shin-Yamaguchi and to Shimonoseki Station.

References

Airports in Japan
Transport in Yamaguchi Prefecture
Buildings and structures in Yamaguchi Prefecture
Airports established in 1966
1966 establishments in Japan